Prince Hyoeun, personal name Wang Won or Wang Suk, also known by his title Prince Dongyang and Grand Prince Dongyang was a prince of Goryeo. He was the youngest son of Taejo of Goryeo and Lady Dongyangwon, and the 15th son of Taejo overall. Through his descendant, Wang Mi (1365-?), ninety percent of the modern day Kaesong Wang clan trace their lineage to Prince Hyoeun. He was the first grandson of Yu Dal (유달) whom served as Gongbusangseo (공부상서).

Later life
He later was executed by his older half-brother, Wang So due to his ferocious personality and he also secretly had different thoughts with people of insignificance. Wang So also said that Hyoeun had a violent temperament and the intention of plotting a rebellion. Both of his sons, Wang Rim (왕림) and Wang Jeong (왕정) whom at this time were too young, escaped from death and fled, hiding in a private house to survive.

Issue
Wang Rim, Prince Dongyang (왕림 동양군, 王琳 東陽君)
Wang Jeong, Duke Ongyeol (? - March 1013) (왕정 온결공, 王禎 溫潔公) – other name was Wang Yu (왕유, 王裕); had 1 daughter, Lady Wang (왕씨) whom later married with Yang Yeo-Yang (양여양) and 1 son, Wang Gyeong-Su (왕경수).

In popular culture
Portrayed by Go Dong-hyun and Park Jin-hyung in the 2002–2003 KBS TV series The Dawn of the Empire.
Portrayed by Ji Eun-sung in the 2015 MBC TV Series Shine or Go Crazy.
Portrayed by Yoon Sun-woo in the 2016 SBS TV Series Moon Lovers: Scarlet Heart Ryeo.

References

External links
효은태자 in Encykorea (in Korean). Retrieved June 2, 2021.

Korean princes
Year of birth unknown
Year of death unknown
10th-century Korean people